Pascual Enguídanos Usach, (Liria, Spain 13 December 1923 - 28 March 2006) also known by his pseudonyms George H. White and Van S. Smith, was a Spanish science fiction writer.

Works
His principal work, published under the name George H. White, is the series known as La saga de los Aznar (The Saga of Aznar). This series was originally published by publishing house in Valencia two seasons, the first part between 1953 and 1958 (just in the novel Fight to death, Tome 12), and the second part between 1973 and 1978, which were recast the first works and added new novels and written in 70 years, thus providing the historical range of an unexpected below (volumes 13 to 23).
 TOMO 1º Los hombres de Venus, El planeta Misterioso, Cerebros electrónicos. 
 TOMO 2ª La Horda Amarilla, Policía sidereal, La Abominable Bestia Gris. 
 TOMO 3º La conquista de un Imperio, El Reino de las Tinieblas. 
 TOMO 4º Salida hacia la Tierra, Venimos a destruir el mundo y Guerra de autómatas. 
 TOMO 5º ¡Redención no contesta!, Mando siniestro, División X. 
 TOMO 6º Invasión nahumita, Mares Tenebrosos. 
 TOMO 7º Contra el Imperio de Nahúm y La Guerra Verde. 
 TOMO 8º Motín en Valera y El enigma de los Hombres Planta. 
 TOMO 9º El azote de la humanidad - El coloso en rebeldía- La Bestia capitula. 
 TOMO 10º ¡Luz sólida! - Hombres de titanio- Ha muerto el Sol. 
 TOMO 11º Exilados de la Tierra- El imperio milenario. 
 TOMO 12º Regreso a la patria.- Lucha a muerte. 
 TOMO 13º Universo remoto - Tierra de titanes. 
 TOMO 14º El angel de la muerte - Los nuevos brujos. 
 TOMO 15º Conquistaremos la Tierra - Puente de mando. 
 TOMO 16º Viajeros en el tiempo - Vinieron del futuro. 
 TOMO 17º Al otro lado del Universo - El planetillo furioso - El ejército fantasma. 
 TOMO 18º ¡Antimateria! - La otra Tierra. 
 TOMO 19º Un millón de años - La rebelión de los robots. 
 TOMO 20º Supervivencia - ¡Thorbod, la raza maldita!. 
 TOMO 21º El retorno de los dioses: La tierra después. 
 TOMO 22º Los últimos de Atolón: Guerra de autoplanetas. 
 TOMO 23º La civilización perdida: Horizontes sin fin: El refugio de los dioses. 
 Extra: TOMO 24º Robinsones cósmicos: Dos mundos frente a frente 
 Extra: TOMO 25º El atom S-2: Embajador en Venus 
 Extra: TOMO ) amongst others.

External links
DEDICATED TO PASCUAL ENGUÍDANOS in Spanish

1923 births
2006 deaths
Futurians
Spanish novelists
Spanish male novelists
Spanish science fiction writers